The Mayor of Tallahassee is head of the executive branch of the government of Tallahassee, Florida.

For part of the city's history the office of mayor was a rotating position chosen among city commissioners. Tallahassee switched to the direct election of its mayors in 1997.

List

Florida Territory
 1826 Charles Haire (Florida politician) was elected Intendant
 1827 David Ochiltree, moved to Florida from Fayetteville, North Carolina. He also served as a justice of the peace. Ochiltree died in 1834 at his residence on Rocky Comfort Creek (Florida). He was a colonel and was a member elect of the Legislative Council of the Territory of Florida for Gadsden County when he died.
 1828-1829 John Y. Gary
 1830 Leslie A. Thompson
 1831 Charles Austin (politician)
 1832-1833 Leslie A. Thompson
 1834 Robert J. Hackley, a pioneer settler sent by his father to an area by Tampa Bay. He was dispossessed of his land for the establishment of Fort Brooke. A case on behalf of his heirs went to the Supreme Court.
 1835 William Wilson (Florida politician)
 1836 John Rea (Florida politician)
 1837 William P. Gorman
 1838 William Hilliard (Florida politician)
 1839 R. F. Ker
 1840 Leslie A. Thompson
 1841–1844 Francis W. Eppes

Statehood
 1845 James A. Berthelot, he also served in the General Assembly and campaigned for another office on a no tax anti bond platform advertised on a poster. He was a mason and part of the Grand Lodge of Florida
 1846 Simon Towle, was also a state comptroller. Owned the Towle House (Tallahassee, Florida)
 1847 James Kirksey
 1848 F. H. Flagg
 1849 Thomas J. Perkins (Florida politician)
 1850-1851 D. P. Hogue (also David P. Hogue or David Porter Hogue, a lawyer who served as Attorney General in Florida.
 1852 David S. Walker
 1853 Richard Hayward (Florida politician)
 1854-1855 Thomas Hayward (Florida politician)
 1856-1857 Francis W. Eppes
 1858-1860 D. P. Hogue

Civil War era and Reconstruction
 1861-1865 P. T. Pearce, he was appointed a trustee of the West Florida Seminary
 1866 Francis W. Eppes, grandson of Thomas Jefferson, returned to office
 1867-1868 D. P. Hogue
 1869-1870 Thaddeus Preston Tatum, was a druggist and served in the Battle of Natural Bridge. lived September 27, 1835 - July 4, 1873 and is buried in the Old City Cemetery.
 1871 Charles Edgar Dyke, a Conservative newspaper editor of the Floridian & Journal
 1872-1874 C. H. Edwards
 1875 David S. Walker, Jr.
 1876 Samuel Walker

Post-Reconstruction
 1877 Jesse Bernard (also known as J. T. Bernard and Jesse Talbot Bernard), first Democratic mayor after Reconstruction, which ended the year he was elected. 
 1878-1879 David S. Walker, Jr.
 1880 Henry Bernreuter, born in Columbus, Georgia to German immigrants, he moved as a child with his family to Florida. He was a Confederate veteran who later served as sheriff and police chief.
 1881 Edward Lewis (Florida politician)
 1882 John W. Nash
 1883 Edward Lewis (Florida politician)
 1884-1885 Charles C. Pearce
 1886 George W. Walker (Tallahassee, FL mayor) 
 1887 A. J. Fish
 1888-1889 R. B. Gorman, served in the Confederate Army and was postmaster in Tallahassee. As mayor, he signed on to a letter from the merchants of Tallahassee to the U.S. Army's Chief of Engineers calling for the St. Marks River to be made navigable to promote trade. In 1889 he reported on negotiations with a Philadelphia, Pennsylvania company for a water works system.
 1890-1894 Richard B. Carpenter, a shopkeeper. Later went into bankruptcy and had a legal case for exemption given individuals declaring bankruptcy, even though the firm was established as a separate entity. Decided on appeal in his favor.
 1895-1896 Jesse Talbot Bernard, a teacher and judge who travelled around Florida to hear cases. Served in the Confederate Army. He kept a diary.
 1897 R. A. Shine
 1898-1902 R. B. Gorman, return to office of mayor

 1903-1904 William L. Moor
 1905 John Ward Henderson, he also served as a legislator.
1906 F. C. Gilmore
1907 W. M. McIntosh, Jr., he also served as Chief Clerk of the state's Comptroller Office.
1908 F. C. Gilmore
1909 Francis B. Winthrop, the Florida State Archives have a photo of the family home as well as a photo of Winthrop, age 3. Florida State University has a photo of him in what appears to be a military uniform ca. 1918 as well as some of his business documents in a collection of his family's papers. His family owned the Barrow Hill Plantation and a house at 610 North Magnolia, which he lived in with his wife for years.
1910-1917 D. M. Lowry

After World War I
1918 J. R. McDaniel
1919-1921 Guyte P. McCord, played on the 1904 Florida State College football team and scored a touchdown in the state championship game against Stetson.
1922-1923 A. P. McCaskill
1924-1925 B. A. Meginniss
1926 W. Theo Proctor
1927 B.A. Meginniss
1928-1929 W. Theo Proctor
1930 G. E. Lewis
1931 Frank D. Moor
1932-1933 W. L. Marshall
1934 J. L. Fain
1935 Leonard A. Wesson
1936 H. J. Yaeger (H. Jack Yaeger)
1937 L. A. Wesson (Leonard A. Wesson, lived at 503 McDaniel)
1938 J. R. Jinks
1939 S. A. Wahnish
1940 F. C. Moor
1941 Charles S. Ausley
1942 Jack W. Simmons
1943 A. R. Richardson
1944 Charles S. Ausley
1945 Ralph E. Proctor

Post-World War II

1946 Fred S. Winterle, he and his son were involved in the oil distribution business.
1947 George I. Martin
1948 Fred N. Lowry
1949-1950 Robert C. Parker disambig needed
1951 William H. Cates
1952 B. A. Ragsdale
1953 William T. Mayo
1954 H. G. Esterwood
1954 H. C. Summitt
1955-1956 J. T. Williams disambig needed
1956 Fred S. Winterle, a return to office
1956-1957 John Y. Humphress
1957 J. W. Cordell
1958 Davis H. Atkinson
1959 Hugh E. Williams, Jr.
1960 George S. Taft disambig needed
1961 J. W. Cordell
1962 Davis H. Atkinson
1963 S. E. Teague, Jr. (Samuel)
1964 Hugh E. Williams, Jr.
1965 George S. Taft
1966 William Haywood Cates, Sr., longest-serving city commissioner in history of Tallahassee. Eventually lost to the first African American elected as commissioner. His son drowned in a hunting accident. Was a religion professor at Florida State University and helped found religious organizations in Tallahassee.
1967 John A. Rudd, Sr.
1968 Gene Berkowitz He also served as a City Commissioner in Tallahassee His wife was a schoolteacher. As a commissioner he voted to reopen the city's pools in the wake of the assassination of Martin Luther King in 1968.
1969 Spurgeon Camp
1970 Lee A. Everhart, founder and president of building company Everhart Construction Company
1971 Gene Berkowitz, return to office
1972 James R. Ford, first African-American mayor
1973 Joan Heggen, first female mayor
1974 Russell R. Bevis
1974 Earl Yancey.  His wife Lucy was the granddaughter of Florida politician Robert Flournoy Hosford.
1975 Johnny Jones
1976 James R. Ford
1977 Ben W. Thompson 
1978 Neal D. Sapp, was a paratrooper in the U.S. Army and graduated from Florida State University with a business. He was a software developer and businessman. He died March 26, 2004.
1979 Sheldon E. Hilaman, also served as a City Commissioner. Went by Shad. Hillaman Golf Course is named for him.
1980 Richard P. Wilson 
1981 Hurley W. Rudd, also served as a city commissioner and multiple terms in the Florida legislature
1982 James R. Ford
1983 Carol Bellamy
1984 Kent Spriggs, a Civil Rights lawyer who also edited a book about Civil Rights leaders in the deep south. Appeared on C-Span while mayor discussing his duties.
1985 Hurley W. Rudd
1986 Jack L. McLean Jr., second African-American mayor
1987 Betty Harley
1988 Frank Visconti
1989 Dorothy Inman-Crews, first female African-American mayor
1990 Steve Meisberg
1991 Debbie Lightsey
1992 Bob Hightower
1993 Dorothy Inman-Crews
1994 Penny Herman
1995 Scott Maddox
1996 Ron Weaver (mayor)
1997–2003 Scott Maddox, first directly-elected mayor
 2003–2014 John Marks, longest-serving mayor in the city's history
 2014–2018 Andrew Gillum, ran for governor in 2018 but lost narrowly to Ron DeSantis
 2018–present John E. Dailey

See also
 Timeline of Tallahassee, Florida

References

Tallahassee